Libějovice is a municipality and village in Strakonice District in the South Bohemian Region of the Czech Republic. It has about 500 inhabitants.

Administrative parts
Villages of Černěves and Nestanice are administrative parts of Libějovice.

Geography
It lies mostly in the České Budějovice Basin. There are several ponds in the territory.

History
The first written mention of Libějovice is from 1264.

Sights

There are two castles in Libějovice, called Old Castle and New Castle. The Old Castle was built in the Renaissance style by William of Rosenberg in the mid-16th century and reconstructed in 1715–1718 by the then-owner Karl Kajetan Lord of Bucquoy. The New Castle was founded by Lords of Buquoy in 1696 but it was not completed until 1754. The late Empire style castle was rebuilt and extended in 1816–1817. Today both castles are privately owned and inaccessible.

The hill Lomec in the southern part of the municipality is one of the most important pilgrimage sites in the region. There is the Lomec Monastery with the Church of the Name of the Virgin Mary. The monastery was originally a hunting manor house built in 1709–1710. Today it is home of the Congregation of the Gray Sisters of the Third Order of Saint Francis. The church belongs to important works of the Baroque in Central Europe. It was built in 1696–1702 for the miraculous statue of the Virgin Mary with Jesus and houses a unique altar, which is an imitation of Bernini's papal altar from the St. Peter's Basilica in Vatican.

References

External links

Villages in Strakonice District